Piedmont City School District is a school district in Calhoun County, Alabama, USA.

References

External links
 

Education in Calhoun County, Alabama